Wayne Trace High School is a public high school in Haviland, Ohio.  It is the only high school in the Wayne Trace Local School District.  Their mascot is the Raider. They are a member of the Green Meadows Conference.  It is a very large district comprising .  The average class size is from 70 to 90.  Wayne Trace High School has several rivalries such as: Tinora, Paulding, and Crestview.

Ohio High School Athletic Association State Championships
 Boys Basketball – 1991 
Boys Basketball Final Four: 1988, 1991, 2001, 2008, 2015
Football State Runners-Up: 2013
Cross Country Runners-Up: 1991

References

External links
 District Website

High schools in Paulding County, Ohio
Public high schools in Ohio